Christian Meyer (born 12 December 1969) is a retired German track cyclist who won the gold medal for his native country in the men's team time trial (100 km) at the 1992 Summer Olympics in Barcelona. His winning teammates were Michael Rich, Bernd Dittert and Uwe Peschel.

References

External links
 

1969 births
Living people
German male cyclists
German track cyclists
Cyclists at the 1992 Summer Olympics
Olympic cyclists of Germany
Olympic gold medalists for Germany
Sportspeople from Freiburg im Breisgau
Olympic medalists in cycling
Medalists at the 1992 Summer Olympics
Cyclists from Baden-Württemberg